Project Hot Seat is a campaign started by Greenpeace. Its goal is to apply intense pressure on members of The United States Congress in order to implement policies that will curb and cut U.S. greenhouse gas emissions, and what Phil Radford, Greenpeace Executive Director said was the "kind of organizing that is going to be key to making the environmental movement into a viable political force in Congress and around the country.".

Purpose

Some of Project Hot Seats aims include reaching a national cap and trade system that makes real reductions within a decade, a national renewable energy standard of at least 20% by 2020, and an increase in average fuel economy to 40 mpg. Project members work to raise awareness of global warming by organizing events such as The International Day of Action. This was a project in which volunteers throughout the world held rallies and outreach events to raise concern for global warming. The most recent was held on December 8, 2007. Some of the events included 25 people taking a polar bear swim in Puget Sound. The project also engages in human art to get its message across. Over 300 participants in Florida sat on a beach in the shape of the state of Florida with the southern tip dipping into the ocean. Below the state they used their bodies to spell out the words "Save our State".

Notes

External links
https://web.archive.org/web/20080305160115/http://members.greenpeace.org/hotseat/National/default/about_us/
http://www.ipcc.ch/

Greenhouse gas emissions in the United States
Greenpeace campaigns